Trachylepis bocagii, also known commonly as Bocage's skink, is a species of lizard in the family Scincidae. The species is native to southern Africa.

Etymology
The specific name, bocagii, is in honor of Portuguese zoologist José Vicente Barbosa du Bocage.

Geographic range
T. bocagii is found in Angola, Malawi, Zambia, and Zimbabwe.

Habitat

Reproduction
T. bocagii is viviparous.

References

Further reading
Bauer AM (2003). "On the identity of Lacerta punctata Linnaeus 1758, the type species of the genus Euprepis Wagler 1830, and the generic assignment of Afro-Malagasy skinks". African Journal of Herpetology 52 (1): 1–7. (Trachylepis bocagii, new combination).
Boulenger GA (1887). Catalogue of the Lizards in the British Museum (Natural History). Second Edition. Volume III. ... Scincidæ ... London: Trustees of the British Museum (Natural History). (Taylor and Francis, printers). xii + 575 pp. + Plates I–XL. (Mabuia bocagii, new species, pp. 203–204).
Hellmich W (1957). "Herpetologische Ergebnisse einer Forschungsreise in Angola ". Veröffentlichungen der Zoologischen Staatssammlung München 5: 1–91. (Mabuya bocagii, p. 61). (in German).

Trachylepis
Reptiles described in 1887
Taxa named by George Albert Boulenger